The Voice Kids is a current Brazilian reality talent show which premiered on TV Globo on January 3, 2016. Based on the reality singing competition The Voice Kids, the series was created by Dutch television producer John de Mol.

The series' original coaches were Carlinhos Brown, Ivete Sangalo and Victor & Leo. Victor Chaves left the show midway through season 2 due to his wife's allegations against him concerning domestic violence. As a result, previously recorded footage of him was edited out from episodes 8 and 9, and Leo became a solo coach for the remaining of the season.

After two seasons, Ivete Sangalo swapped roles with Claudia Leitte to become a coach on The Voice Brasil, while Simone & Simaria replaced Victor & Leo permanently for season 3. For season 6, Gaby Amarantos and Michel Teló replaced Claudia Leitte and Simone & Simaria respectively. Maiara & Maraisa replaced Gaby Amarantos for season 7.

Overview 
The series is part of The Voice franchise and is based on a similar competition format in the Netherlands entitled The Voice of Holland. The winner receives a R$ 250.000 prize and a recording contract with Universal Music Group. Participants are required to be between the ages of 8 and 14.

Format
The series consists of three phases: 
 Blind audition
 Battle round
 Live performance shows

Blind audition
Three coaches, all famous musicians, will choose teams of 24 contestants each (21 in Season 7) through a blind audition process.  Each judge has the length of the auditionee's performance to decide if he or she wants that singer on his or her team; if two or more judges want the same singer then the singer gets to choose which coach they want to work with.

Battle round
Each team of singers will be mentored and developed by their coach. In this stage, coaches will have three of their team members battle against each other by singing the same song, with the coach choosing which team member will advance to the next stage.

Live performance shows
In the final phase, the remaining contestants of each team will compete against each other in four or five weeks of live broadcasts. The television audience will help to decide who moves on. When one team member remains for each coach, these three contestants will compete against each other in the season finale, with the most voted singer declared the season's winner.

Coaches and hosts

Coaches

Hosts

Key
 Main host
 Backstage

Series overview

Ratings and reception

The Voice Kids no Parquinho
An aftershow series titled The Voice Kids no Parquinho and presented by Ana Clara Lima premiered on Globoplay on June 11, 2021.

References

External links
Official website on Gshow.com

The Voice Brasil
2016 Brazilian television series debuts
Brazilian reality television series
Reality television spin-offs
Portuguese-language television shows
Rede Globo original programming
Television series about children
Television series about teenagers